TCG Kocatepe may refer to a number of warships operated by the Turkish Naval Forces:

 TCG Kocatepe (D 354), an American Gearing-class destroyer, in operation from 1971 to 1974
 TCG Kocatepe (1945), an American Gearing-class destroyer, in operation from 1974 to 1994
 TCG Kocatepe (F-252), an American  Knox-class frigate, in operation from 2002 to 2005

See also
 Kocatepe (disambiguation)

Turkish Navy ship names